Pain Mahalleh-ye Qasemabad (also Romanized as Pā’īn Maḩalleh-ye Qāsemābād) is a village in Owshiyan Rural District, Chaboksar District, Rudsar County, Gilan Province, Iran. At the 2006 census, its population was 487, in 138 families.

References 

Populated places in Rudsar County